The All Japan High School Soccer Tournament (全国高等学校サッカー選手権大会, Zenkoku kōtō gakkō sakkā senshuken taikai, 全国高校サッカー選手権大会, Zenkoku kō kō sakkā senshuken taikai) of Japan, commonly known as "Winter Kokuritsu" (冬の国立 Fuyu no Kokuritsu), is an annual nationwide high school association football tournament. It is the largest scale amateur sport event in Japan, even as soccer continues to gain more attention.

The tournament, organized by the Japan Football Association, All Japan High School Athletic Federation and Nippon Television, takes place during the winter school vacation period, culminating in a two-week final tournament stage with 48 teams in December to January at National Capital Region side.

Venues

Current venues (2022)
Japan National Stadium
Komazawa Olympic Park Stadium
Ajinomoto Field Nishigaoka
Urawa Komaba Stadium
NACK5 Stadium Omiya
Kashiwanoha Stadium
ZA Oripri Stadium
NHK Spring Mitsuzawa Football Stadium
Kawasaki Todoroki Stadium

Previous venues (since tournament moved to Kanto)
Saitama Stadium 2002
National Stadium
Oi Futo Chuo Kaihin Park Athletics Stadium
Edogawa Stadium
Kawagoe Sports Park Athletics Stadium
Chiba Sports Stadium
Frontier Soccer Field
Fukuda Denshi Arena
Yokohama Mitsuzawa Athletic Stadium
Shonan BMW Stadium Hiratsuka
Sagamihara Gion Stadium

Finals

Results

Records and statistics

Most successful prefectures

Most successful high schools

Overall top goalscorers

Single season top goalscorers

External links
 Official website – JFA (Japan Football Association)

Football competitions in Japan
Youth football competitions
Youth football in Japan
Recurring sporting events established in 1917